Kentucky Route 582 (KY 582) is a  state highway in Knott County, Kentucky, that runs from KY 160 northeast of Littcarr to KY 7 at Kite via Spider, Pine Top, Nealy, May, Omaha, and Martinsville.

Major intersections

References

0582
Transportation in Knott County, Kentucky